Wan'an is a town under the administration of Shuangliu District, Chengdu, Sichuan, China. , it has 12 residential communities and 2 villages under its administration.

See also 
 List of township-level divisions of Sichuan

References 

Township-level divisions of Sichuan
Geography of Chengdu
Subdistricts of the People's Republic of China